"Rewind" is the third single from Scottish singer/songwriter Paolo Nutini, which was released on 4 December 2006. It was taken from his debut album, These Streets, and was the follow-up to his hits "Last Request" and "Jenny Don't Be Hasty". The single missed the top 20 but gave him his third consecutive top 30 hit single on the UK Singles Chart, peaking at number 27. On 1 June 2008, it returned to the UK Singles Chart at number 98.

The song was covered by fellow Scottish act The View on Radio 1's Live Lounge on 17 January 2007.

It has been used on the television series CSI: Miami, The Hills, and Eli Stone, and featured on the soundtrack to the film P.S. I Love You.

Charts

Certifications

References

2006 singles
2006 songs
Atlantic Records UK singles
Paolo Nutini songs
Songs written by Jim Duguid
Songs written by Paolo Nutini